Roman Aleksandrovich Dobrokhotov (born August 6, 1983) is a Russian investigative journalist, political scientist and activist. He is the founder and editor-in-chief of The Insider, a Russia-focused media outlet. He is also one of the founders and leaders of the 5th of December Party, a member of the federal political council of the Solidarnost movement and member of the political council of the Solidarnost's Moscow branch.

Early life and education 

His father is the Russian philosopher Alexander Dobrokhotov. From 2000 to 2006, he studied at Moscow State Institute of International Relations (MGIMO) at the Faculty of Political Science. In 2006—2007, in graduate school at the Higher School of Economics in Moscow. The topic of Dobrokhotov's PhD thesis was "Trust in world politics".

Career 
Since 2005, he has been leader of the movement "We", a member of the federal political council of the movement Solidarnost since the foundation of the movement in 2008, a member of the political council of the Moscow branch of Solidarnost since 2009. From 2006 to 2008, he was a columnist and deputy editor of the department of economics of the Novye Izvestia newspaper.

From 2006 to 2008, he worked as a freelance employee of the radio station , where he hosted the weekly program .

In July 2009, Dobrokhotov announced his intention to run in elections to the Moscow City Duma in a single-mandate constituency number 5. His nomination was supported by the Solidarnost movement. The Moscow City Electoral Commission refused to register him, motivating the refusal with claims to the quality of the collected signatures.

In January 2010, he began working as a researcher at the State Academic University for the Humanities (GAUGN), where he taught political science.

In March 2010, Dobrokhotov signed the online manifesto of the Russian opposition "Putin Must Go".

Since April 2010, he worked as editor of the online newspaper Slon.ru.

On May 26, 2011, in response to the "Appeal to the country's leadership with a request to change the cultural policy of Russia", he organized a collection of signatures on his blog under the "Open letter to cultural figures".

On June 7, 2011, a political debate between the Nashi and Solidarnost movements took place at the ArteFAQ club in Moscow. Maria Kislitsyna and Gleb Krainik spoke on behalf of Nashi, Roman Dobrokhotov,  and Anastasia Rybachenko on behalf of Solidarnost. In June 2011, he took part in the forum of civil activists "Antiseliger". In 2012, he accepted an offer to participate in the Seliger (forum) and gave a lecture there on corruption in the Kremlin, in which he spoke about businessman Yury Kovalchuk, his son Boris Kovalchuk, Gennady Timchenko and about "Mikhail Ivanovich" (Vladimir Putin's pseudonym).

Dobrokhotov became one of the founders of the "Party of December 5" in the summer of 2012.

In January 2013, Dobrokhotov became the author of the Come-Out Week project dedicated to the problems of the LGBT community. In 2013, he resigned from Slon.ru along with part of the editorial board. , then editor-in-chief of Slon.ru, commenting on Dobrokhotov's dismissal, said: "It was impossible to work with him further. He does not see himself as a journalist, but rather a politician."

On 30 September 2021, the Federal Security Service (FSB) raided Dobrokhotov's home, where his wife lived, and his parents’ apartment in Moscow after he allegedly crossed the border illegally and has been placed on a wanted list.

Incident with President Medvedev 
On December 12, 2008, Dobrokhotov attracted media attention by interrupting a speech by then Russian President Dmitry Medvedev, when Medvedev proposed constitutional amendments extending the presidential term. He shouted: "The amendments are a disgrace”, adding that "there are no real elections." Federal Guard Service escorted Dobrokhotov away and tried to shut his mouth. The incident was cut from the broadcast of Medvedev's speech on federal TV channels, but was shown on the air of the St. Petersburg Channel Five. On the same day, Dobrokhotov was fired from his job at the radio .

Participation in opposition rallies 

On January 31, 2010, Dobrokhotov was detained at the rally Strategy-31 in support of Article 31 of the Constitution, which guarantees freedom of assembly. On September 28, 2010, he was detained at a rally against the former mayor of Moscow Yury Luzhkov.

On December 4, 2011, he was detained at Triumfalnaya Square in Moscow. He spoke from the stage of the rally "For Fair Elections" on Chistye Prudy in Moscow on December 5, 2011. Dobrokhotov was inspired by the 1989 Baltic Way campaign and organized a bright flash mob Big White Ring. The action took place on February 26, 2012.

On the birthday of Putin on October 7, 2012, he came with a rake to the rally "Let's take grandfather to retire" in Moscow; he was detained by the police. A year earlier, he was detained at an action by the pro-government movement Nashi, dedicated to another birthday of Putin.

On May 6, 2013, during the rally "Freedom to Prisoners on May 6" on Bolotnaya Square in Moscow, Orthodox activists attacked Dobrokhotov.

Awards 
 2018 "Journalism as a Profession" award in the Investigative journalism category.
 2019 European Press Prize Investigative Reporting Award with ‘Unmasking the Salisbury Poisoning Suspects: A Four-Part Investigation‘.
 2021 Redkollegia award for an article "Counter-sanctions. How FSB officers tried to poison Vladimir Kara-Murza".

References

External links 
 Roman Dobrokhotov All publications of the author. Slon.ru.
 Roman Dobrokhotov article in Lentapedia. 2012.

1983 births
Living people
Moscow State Institute of International Relations alumni
Solidarnost politicians
Russian anti-corruption activists
Russian prisoners and detainees
European Press Prize winners
Journalists from Moscow
Russian journalists
Russian investigative journalists
Russian male journalists
Free speech activists
Journalism as a Profession Awards winners
Russian political scientists
Redkollegia award winners
Higher School of Economics alumni
People listed in Russia as media foreign agents
Russian activists against the 2022 Russian invasion of Ukraine